Scott Slapin (born 1974) is an American composer and violist.

Career 
Slapin has written more than sixty viola-centric chamber works and was commissioned to write the required piece for the 2008 Primrose International Viola Competition. He served on the committee for the first Maurice Gardner Composition Competition and co-premiered the winning work, Rachel Matthews' Dreams, at the 38th International Viola Congress. At the age of eighteen he was performing daily as the solo violist in the New York City production of Gerald Busby's Orpheus In Love, a chamber opera about Orpheus recast as a viola player. He was subsequently invited to premiere Busby's Muse for Solo Viola in Carnegie's Weill Hall, and he gave countless solo recitals and performed with ensembles throughout the United States and South America. Slapin has written extensively for the Penn State Viola Ensemble and the Wistaria String Quartet, and he is a former fellow at the Montalvo Arts Center in California. He can be heard playing solo Bach, Paganini Caprices, and his own compositions on various soundtracks for film and TV. Slapin performs and records with his wife, Tanya Solomon, also a violist. They won 'Best Chamber Performance of 2008' at the Tribute to the Classical Arts in New Orleans, and they have premiered and recorded duos by Gerald Busby, Robert Cobert, Richard Lane, Rachel Matthews, Patrick Neher, Frank Proto and David Rimelis, among others. Slapin plays a viola built by Hiroshi Iizuka.

Recordings 
To date, there have been nine recordings of Slapin's chamber music made by the Wistaria String Quartet, the Penn State Viola Ensemble, the American Viola Quartet, and the Slapin-Solomon Viola Duo. Slapin was the first person to record the complete cycle of Bach's Sonatas and Partitas (originally for violin) on viola, a set which he rerecorded in 2006. He has premiered and recorded many 20th and 21st Century recital works featuring the viola, and he is the featured soloist on the first album produced by the American Viola Society. His 2008 recording, Paganini's 24 Caprices, marked the first time Paganini's 24 Caprices had been recorded on a viola in standard tuning since Emanuel Vardi in 1965. After more than a decade of performing together as members of several orchestras, Slapin and Solomon transcribed for viola duo some of the symphonic repertoire's best-known works and in 2017 made an unprecedented two-viola recording of four of them: Wagner's Ride of the Valkyries, Tchaikovsky's 1812 Overture, Rossini's Overture to the Barber of Seville, as well as an unabridged version of all four movements of Beethoven's Fifth Symphony.

Education
Slapin graduated at the age of eighteen from the Manhattan School of Music, where he studied with Emanuel Vardi., In memory of Vardi, he wrote 'Capricious', a viola trio which references several of Paganini's Caprices. Slapin's Nocturne is dedicated to his composition teacher and mentor Richard Lane and can be heard, along with Slapin's Elegy-Caprice, in the final scenes of the American docudrama Secret Life, Secret Death

References

External links
 
Slapin-Solomon Viola Duo
Tanya Solomon's Website

American classical violists
Living people
1974 births